Buchananiella continua is a species of bugs in the family Lyctocoridae. It is found in Africa, Europe and Northern Asia (excluding China), North America, Oceania, and South America.

References

Further reading

External links

 

Articles created by Qbugbot
Insects described in 1879
Lyctocoridae